Nejc Pečnik (born 3 January 1986) is a Slovenian professional footballer who plays for Dravograd. Primarily an attacking midfielder, he can also play as a winger or forward.

He represented Slovenia at the 2010 FIFA World Cup. Prior to that, he had been directly responsible for Slovenia's successful qualification to the tournament as he scored an away goal against Russia in the 2010 World Cup qualification playoffs.

Pečnik's older brother, Andrej, is also a former professional footballer.

Club career

Celje
Born in Dravograd, Slovenia (then part of Yugoslavia), Pečnik started his career at hometown club Dravograd. After showing promise in its youth teams he was signed by Celje, making his first division debut on 24 April 2004 against Ljubljana.

The following year Pečnik played in only seven league matches, adding a few cup appearances including the final against Gorica. In the 2005–06 season he managed to gain a regular place in the first team, eventually establishing himself as a key offensive player.

In 2007–08, Pečnik was Celje's top scorer with 14 league goals. After five seasons he was loaned out in June 2008 to Sparta Prague, but appeared rarely with the Czech first division outfit during his six-month stay, spending most of his time with the reserve squad.

Nacional
After a further 15 league games with Celje, Pečnik signed with Nacional of Portugal. On 16 July 2012, after three seasons of irregular playing time, also being loaned to Russian club Krylia Sovetov Samara for five months, he signed a two-year deal with Sheffield Wednesday in the Football League Championship.

Sheffield Wednesday
In his official debut with the Owls, on 12 August 2012, Pečnik missed a penalty and was booked before half-time, as his team trailed at Oldham Athletic 2–0. He played the full 90 minutes in an eventual 4–2 win for the season's Football League Cup.

Pečnik was released by Wednesday at the end of his only campaign.

Red Star Belgrade
On 1 July 2013, Pečnik agreed a two-year contract with Serbian side Red Star Belgrade. He scored  his first goal for Red Star against ÍBV in the second qualifying round of the 2013–14 UEFA Europa League.

International career
Pečnik made his debut for the Slovenia national team on 1 April 2009, in a 2010 FIFA World Cup qualifier against Northern Ireland.

He scored his first goal for Slovenia on 10 October 2009, in the same competition, a 2–0 win over Slovakia. On 14 November 2009, he scored a decisive away goal in the 2010 World Cup qualification playoffs, as the national side lost 2–1 against Russia at the Luzhniki Stadium, only to win 1–0 in the second leg, taking the tie on the away goals and qualifying for a World Cup for the second time in the nation's history; in the final stages, he appeared twice as a late substitute, having to be however stretchered off in the match against the United States.

Career statistics

Club

International goals

Scores and results list Slovenia's goal tally first, score column indicates score after each Pečnik goal.

Honours
Celje
Slovenian Cup: 2004–05
Red Star
 Serbian SuperLiga: 2013–14

See also
Slovenian international players

References

External links

Profile at JEF United Chiba 
NZS player profile 

1986 births
Living people
People from Dravograd
Slovenian footballers
Association football midfielders
Association football wingers
Slovenia international footballers
Slovenia under-21 international footballers
Slovenia youth international footballers
2010 FIFA World Cup players
NK Celje players
NK Dravograd players
AC Sparta Prague players
C.D. Nacional players
PFC Krylia Sovetov Samara players
Sheffield Wednesday F.C. players
Red Star Belgrade footballers
JEF United Chiba players
Omiya Ardija players
Tochigi SC players
Slovenian PrvaLiga players
Slovenian Second League players
Czech First League players
Czech National Football League players
Primeira Liga players
Russian Premier League players
English Football League players
Serbian SuperLiga players
J2 League players
J1 League players
J3 League players
Slovenian expatriate footballers
Slovenian expatriate sportspeople in the Czech Republic
Expatriate footballers in the Czech Republic
Slovenian expatriate sportspeople in Portugal
Expatriate footballers in Portugal
Slovenian expatriate sportspeople in Russia
Expatriate footballers in Russia
Slovenian expatriate sportspeople in England
Expatriate footballers in England
Slovenian expatriate sportspeople in Serbia
Expatriate footballers in Serbia
Slovenian expatriate sportspeople in Japan
Expatriate footballers in Japan
Slovenian expatriate sportspeople in Austria
Expatriate footballers in Austria